Patrick A. Lee (born 8 September 1946, British Hong Kong) is a professor of physics at the Massachusetts Institute of Technology (MIT).

After spending ten years with the Theoretical Physics Department at Bell Laboratories, Lee joined MIT in 1982. He has contributed to the field of "mesoscopic physics," or the study of small devices at low temperatures. He has also made important contributions to the theory of disordered electronic systems, among them the concept of universal conductance fluctuations. He was awarded the 2005 Dirac Medal of the International Centre for Theoretical Physics as well as the Oliver Buckley Prize of the American Physical Society. He is currently researching high temperature superconductors.

Awards
Eugene Feenberg Medal, 2013
Dirac Medal, 2005 (International Centre for Theoretical Physics)
Oliver E. Buckley Condensed Matter Prize, 1991
Fellow of the American Physical Society, 1986

Publications

External links
Faculty profile at MIT
Array of Contemporary Physicists biography

References

1946 births
Living people
Massachusetts Institute of Technology School of Science faculty
Oliver E. Buckley Condensed Matter Prize winners
Fellows of the American Physical Society